Bedford Park is a village in Cook County, Illinois, United States, and is an industrial suburb of Chicago. The population was 602 at the 2020 census. Bedford Park consists of a small residential area and vast amounts of heavy industry sprawling to the east and a small amount to the west.

Geography
Bedford Park is located at  (41.768508, -87.785803).

Demographics
As of the 2020 census there were 602 people, 211 households, and 166 families residing in the village. The racial makeup of the village was 61.30% White, 2.82% African American, 0.33% Native American, 1.66% Asian, 0.17% Pacific Islander, 13.62% from other races, and 20.10% from two or more races. Hispanic or Latino of any race were 36.88% of the population.

The top ancestries reported were Polish (16.1%), Irish (12.4%), German (9.7%), and Italian (6.7%).

There were 211 households, out of which 75.36% had children under the age of 18 living with them, 60.66% were married couples living together, 15.64% had a female householder with no husband present, and 21.33% were non-families. 17.06% of all households were made up of individuals, and 6.64% had someone living alone who was 65 years of age or older. The average household size was 3.63 and the average family size was 3.17.

The village's age distribution consisted of 26.5% under the age of 18, 7.8% from 18 to 24, 23.9% from 25 to 44, 27.5% from 45 to 64, and 14.3% who were 65 years of age or older. The median age was 37.4 years. For every 100 females, there were 136.4 males. For every 100 females age 18 and over, there were 113.9 males.

The median income for a household in the village was $99,375, and the median income for a family was $99,500. Males had a median income of $47,083 versus $47,700 for females. The per capita income for the village was $37,871. About 4.2% of families and 3.7% of the population were below the poverty line, including 5.1% of those under age 18 and 0.0% of those age 65 or over.

Government
Bedford Park is in Illinois's 3rd congressional district.

Education
Elementary and middle school students attend school in Cook County School District 104, which operates Walker Elementary School in Bedford Park. High school students move on to Argo Community High School District 217 in Summit.

The Bedford Park Public Library is in the community.

Parks and recreation
The Bedford Park District operates public parks in Bedford Park and Bridgeview Gardens.

Business
The Institute for Food Safety and Health is located in Bedford Park, adjacent to the Ingredion plant. It is affiliated with the Illinois Institute of Technology and the Food and Drug Administration's Center for Food Safety and Applied Nutrition.

References

External links
Village of Bedford Park official website

Villages in Illinois
Chicago metropolitan area
Villages in Cook County, Illinois
Populated places established in 1940
1940 establishments in Illinois